Walter de Wetheringsete was an English medieval theologian and university chancellor.

Walter de Wetheringsete was a Doctor of Divinity. He was elected as Chancellor of the University of Oxford by 8 November 1302.

References

Year of birth unknown
Year of death unknown
English Roman Catholic theologians
Chancellors of the University of Oxford
13th-century English people
14th-century English people